Wang Jingwei (4 May 1883 – 10 November 1944), born as Wang Zhaoming and widely known by his pen name Jingwei, was a Chinese politician. He was initially a member of the left wing of the Kuomintang, leading a government in Wuhan in opposition to the right-wing government in Nanjing, but later became increasingly anti-communist after his efforts to collaborate with the Chinese Communist Party ended in political failure. His political orientation veered sharply to the right later in his career after he collaborated with the Japanese.

Wang was a close associate of Sun Yat-sen for the last twenty years of Sun's life. After Sun's death in 1925 Wang engaged in a political struggle with Chiang Kai-shek for control over the Kuomintang, but lost. Wang remained inside the Kuomintang, but continued to have disagreements with Chiang until the outbreak of the Second Sino-Japanese War in 1937, after which he accepted an invitation from the Japanese Empire to form a Japanese-supported collaborationist government in Nanking. Wang served as the head of state for this Japanese puppet government until he died, shortly before the end of World War II. His legacy remains controversial among historians. Although he is still regarded as an important contributor in the Xinhai Revolution, his collaboration with Imperial Japan is a subject of academic debate, and the typical narratives often regard him as a traitor in the War of Resistance with his name becoming synonymous with treason.

Early life and education

Born in Sanshui, Guangdong, but of Zhejiang origin, Wang went to Japan as an international student sponsored by the Qing Dynasty government in 1903, and joined the Tongmenghui in 1905. As a young man, Wang came to blame the Qing dynasty for holding China back, and making it too weak to fight off exploitation by Western imperialist powers. While in Japan, Wang became a close confidant of Sun Yat-sen, and would later go on to become one of the most important members of the early Kuomintang. He was among the Chinese nationalists in Japan who were influenced by Russian anarchism, and published a number of articles in journals edited by Zhang Renjie, Wu Zhihui, and the group of Chinese anarchists in Paris.

Early career
In the years leading up to the Xinhai Revolution in 1911, Wang was active in opposing the Qing government. Wang gained prominence during this period as an excellent public speaker and a staunch advocate of Chinese nationalism. He was jailed for plotting an assassination of the regent, Prince Chun, and readily admitted his guilt at trial. He remained in jail from 1910 until the Wuchang Uprising the next year, and became something of a national hero upon his release.

During and after the Xinhai Revolution, Wang's political life was defined by his opposition to Western imperialism.  In the early 1920s, he held several posts in Sun Yat-sen's Revolutionary Government in Guangzhou, and was the only member of Sun's inner circle to accompany him on trips outside of Kuomintang (KMT)-held territory in the months immediately preceding Sun's death. He is believed by many to have drafted Sun's will during the short period before Sun's death, in the winter of 1925. He was considered one of the main contenders to replace Sun as leader of the KMT, but eventually lost control of the party and army to Chiang Kai-shek. Wang had clearly lost control of the KMT by 1926, when, following the Zhongshan Warship Incident, Chiang successfully sent Wang and his family to vacation in Europe. It was important for Chiang to have Wang away from Guangdong while Chiang was in the process of expelling communists from the KMT because Wang was then the leader of the left wing of the KMT, notably sympathetic to communists and communism, and may have opposed Chiang if he had remained in China.

Rivalry with Chiang Kai-shek

Leader of the Wuhan Government
During the Northern Expedition, Wang was the leading figure in the left-leaning faction of the KMT that called for continued cooperation with the Chinese Communist Party. Although Wang collaborated closely with Chinese communists in Wuhan, he was philosophically opposed to communism and regarded the KMT's Comintern advisors with suspicion. He did not believe that Communists could be true patriots or true Chinese nationalists.

In early 1927, shortly before Chiang captured Shanghai and moved the capital to Nanjing, Wang's faction declared the capital of the Republic to be Wuhan. While attempting to direct the government from Wuhan, Wang was notable for his close collaboration with leading communist figures, including Mao Zedong, Chen Duxiu, and Borodin, and for his faction's provocative land reform policies. Wang later blamed the failure of his Wuhan government on its excessive adoption of communist agendas. Wang's regime was opposed by Chiang Kai-shek, who was in the midst of a bloody purge of communists in Shanghai and was calling for a push farther north. The separation between the governments of Wang and Chiang are known as the "Ninghan Separation".

Chiang Kai-shek occupied Shanghai in April 1927, and began a bloody suppression of suspected communists known as the "Shanghai Massacre". Within several weeks of Chiang's suppression of communists in Shanghai, Wang's leftist government was attacked by a KMT-aligned warlord and promptly disintegrated, leaving Chiang as the sole legitimate leader of the Republic. KMT troops occupying territories formerly controlled by Wang conducted massacres of suspected Communists in many areas: around Changsha alone, over ten thousand people were killed in a single twenty-day period. Fearing retribution as a communist sympathizer, Wang publicly claimed allegiance to Chiang before fleeing to Europe.

Political activities in Chiang's government
Between 1929 and 1930, Wang collaborated with Feng Yuxiang and Yan Xishan to form a central government in opposition to the one headed by Chiang. Wang took part in a conference hosted by Yan to draft a new constitution, and was to serve as the Prime Minister under Yan, who would be president. Wang's attempts to aid Yan's government ended when Chiang defeated the alliance in the Central Plains War.

In 1931, Wang joined another anti-Chiang government in Guangzhou. After Chiang defeated this regime, Wang reconciled with Chiang's Nanjing government and held prominent posts for most of the decade. Wang was appointed premier just as the Battle of Shanghai (1932) began. He had frequent disputes with Chiang and would resign in protest several times only to have his resignation rescinded. As a result of these power struggles within the KMT, Wang was forced to spend much of his time in exile. He traveled to Germany, and maintained some contact with Adolf Hitler. As the leader of the Kuomintang's left-wing faction and a man who had been closely associated with Dr. Sun, Chiang wanted Wang as premier both to protect the "progressive" reputation of his government which was waging a civil war with the Communists and a shield for protecting his government from widespread public criticism of Chiang's policy of "first internal pacification, then external resistance" (i.e. first defeat the Communists, then confront Japan). Despite the fact that Wang and Chiang disliked and distrusted each other, Chiang was prepared to make compromises to keep Wang on as premier. In regards to Japan, Wang and Chiang differed in that Wang was extremely pessimistic about China's ability to win the coming war with Japan (which almost everyone in 1930s China regarded as inevitable) and was opposed to alliances with any foreign powers should the war come.

While being opposed to any effort at this time to subordinate China to Japan, Wang also saw the "white powers" like the Soviet Union, Britain and the United States as equal if not greater dangers to China, insisting that China had to defeat Japan solely by its own efforts if the Chinese were to hope to maintain their independence. But at the same time, Wang's belief that China was too economically backward at present to win a war against a Japan which had been aggressively modernizing since the Meiji Restoration of 1867 made him the advocate of avoiding war with Japan at almost any cost and trying to negotiate some sort of an agreement with Japan which would preserve China's independence. Chiang by contrast believed that if his modernization program was given enough time, China would win the coming war and that if the war came before his modernization plans were complete, he was willing to ally with any foreign power to defeat Japan, even including the Soviet Union, which was supporting the Chinese Communists in the civil war. Chiang was much more of a hardline anti-Communist than was Wang, but Chiang was also a self-proclaimed "realist" who was willing if necessary to have an alliance with the Soviet Union. Though in the short-run, Wang and Chiang agreed on the policy of "first internal pacification, then external resistance", in the long-run they differed as Wang was more of an appeaser while Chiang just wanted to buy time to modernize China for the coming war. The effectiveness of the KMT was constantly hindered by leadership and personal struggles, such as that between Wang and Chiang. In December 1935, Wang permanently left the premiership after being seriously wounded during an assassination attempt engineered a month earlier by Wang Yaqiao.

In 1936, Wang clashed with Chiang over foreign policy. In an ironic role reversal, the left-wing "progressive" Wang argued for accepting the German-Japanese offer of having China sign the Anti-Comintern Pact while the right-wing "reactionary" Chiang wanted a rapprochement with the Soviet Union. During the 1936 Xi'an Incident, in which Chiang was taken prisoner by his own general, Zhang Xueliang, Wang favored sending a "punitive expedition" to attack Zhang. He was apparently ready to march on Zhang, but Chiang's wife, Soong Mei-ling, and brother-in-law, T. V. Soong, feared that such an action would lead to Chiang's death and his replacement by Wang, so they successfully opposed this action.

Wang accompanied the government on its retreat to Chongqing during the Second Sino-Japanese War (1937–1945). During this time, he organized some right-wing groups along European fascist lines inside the KMT. Wang was originally part of the pro-war group; but, after the Japanese were successful in occupying large areas of coastal China, Wang became known for his pessimistic view on China's chances in the war against Japan. He often voiced defeatist opinions in KMT staff meetings, and continued to express his view that Western imperialism was the greater danger to China, much to the chagrin of his associates. Wang believed that China needed to reach a negotiated settlement with Japan so that Asia could resist Western Powers.

Alliance with the Axis Powers

In late 1938, Wang left Chongqing for Hanoi, French Indochina, where he stayed for three months and announced his support for a negotiated settlement with the Japanese. During this time, he was wounded in an assassination attempt by KMT agents. Wang then flew to Shanghai, where he entered negotiations with Japanese authorities. The Japanese invasion had given him the opportunity he had long sought to establish a new government outside of Chiang Kai-shek's control.

On 30 March 1940, Wang became the head of state of what came to be known as the Wang Jingwei regime (formally "the Reorganized National Government of the Republic of China") based in Nanjing, serving as the President of the Executive Yuan and Chairman of the National Government. In November 1940, Wang's government signed the "Sino-Japanese Treaty" with the Japanese, a document that has been compared with Japan's Twenty-one Demands for its broad political, military, and economic concessions. In June 1941, Wang gave a public radio address from Tokyo in which he praised Japan and affirmed China's submission to it while criticizing the Kuomintang government, and pledged to work with the Empire of Japan to resist Communism and Western imperialism. Wang continued to orchestrate politics within his regime in concert with Chiang's international relationship with foreign powers, seizing the French Concession and the International Settlement of Shanghai in 1943, after Western nations agreed by consensus to abolish extraterritoriality.

The Government of National Salvation of the collaborationist "Republic of China", which Wang headed, was established on the Three Principles of Pan-Asianism, anti-communism, and opposition to Chiang Kai-shek. Wang continued to maintain his contacts with German Nazis and Italian fascists he had established while in exile.

Administration of the Wang Jingwei regime

Chinese under the regime had greater access to coveted wartime luxuries, and the Japanese enjoyed things like matches, rice, tea, coffee, cigars, foods, and alcoholic drinks, all of which were scarce in Japan proper, but consumer goods became more scarce after Japan entered World War II. In Japan-occupied Chinese territories, the prices of basic necessities rose substantially, as Japan's war effort expanded. In Shanghai in 1941, they increased elevenfold.
 
Daily life was often difficult in the Nanjing Nationalist government-controlled Republic of China, and grew more so as the war turned against Japan (c. 1943). Local residents resorted to the black market to obtain needed items. The Japanese Kempeitai, Tokko, collaborationist Chinese police, and Chinese citizens in the service of the Japanese all worked to censor information, monitor any opposition, and torture enemies and dissenters. A "native" secret agency, the Tewu, was created with the aid of Japanese Army "advisors". The Japanese also established prisoner-of-war detention centers, concentration camps, and kamikaze training centers to indoctrinate pilots.

Since Wang's government held authority only over territories under Japanese military occupation, there was a limited amount that officials loyal to Wang could do to ease the suffering of Chinese under Japanese occupation. Wang himself became a focal point of anti-Japanese resistance. He was demonized and branded as an "arch-traitor" in both KMT and Communist propaganda. Wang and his government were deeply unpopular with the Chinese populace, who regarded them as traitors to both the Chinese state and Han Chinese identity. Wang's rule was constantly undermined by resistance and sabotage.

The strategy of the local education system was to create a workforce suited for employment in factories and mines, and for manual labor in general. The Japanese also attempted to introduce their culture and dress to the Chinese. Complaints and agitation called for more meaningful Chinese educational development. Shinto temples and similar cultural centers were built in order to instill Japanese culture and values. These activities came to a halt at the end of the war.

Death
In March 1944, Wang left for Japan to undergo medical treatment for the wound left by an assassination attempt in 1939. He died in Nagoya on 10 November 1944, less than a year before Japan's surrender to the Allies, thus avoiding a trial for treason. Many of his senior followers who lived to see the end of the war were executed. His death was not reported in occupied China until the afternoon of 12 November, after commemorative events for Sun Yat-sen's birth had concluded. Wang was buried in Nanjing near the Sun Yat-sen Mausoleum, in an elaborately constructed tomb. Soon after Japan's defeat, the Kuomintang government under Chiang Kai-shek moved its capital back to Nanjing, destroyed Wang's tomb, and burned the body. Today, the site is commemorated with a small pavilion that notes Wang as a traitor.

Legacy
For his role in the Pacific War, Wang has been considered a traitor by most post-World War II Chinese historians in both Taiwan and mainland China. His name has become a byword for "traitor" or "treason" in mainland China and Taiwan, similarly to "Quisling" in Europe, "Benedict Arnold" in the United States, or "Mir Jafar" in Bangladesh and South Asia. The mainland's communist government despised Wang not only for his collaboration with the Japanese, but also for his anti-communism, while the KMT downplayed his anti-communism and emphasized his collaboration with imperial Japan and betrayal of Chiang Kai-shek. The communists also used his ties with the KMT to demonstrate what they saw as the duplicitous, treasonous nature of the KMT. Both sides downplayed his earlier association with Sun Yat-sen because of his eventual collaboration.

Despite the notoriety added to his name, academics continue to discuss whether or not he should be unequivocally condemned as a traitor because Wang also contributed greatly to the Xinhai Revolution and to the later mediation between the Communist Party and the Nationalist Party in postwar China. They argue that Wang collaborated with the Japanese because he believed that collaboration was the only hope for his desperate countrymen.

Personal life
Wang was married to Chen Bijun and had six children with her, five of whom survived into adulthood. Of those who survived into adulthood, Wang's eldest son, Wenjin, was born in France in 1913. Wang's eldest daughter, Wenxing, was born in France in 1915, worked as a teacher in Hong Kong after 1948, retired to the US in 1984 and died in 2015. Wang's second daughter, Wang Wenbin, was born in 1920. Wang's third daughter, Wenxun, was born in Guangzhou in 1922 and died in 2002 in Hong Kong. Wang's second son, Wenti, was born in 1928 and was sentenced in 1946 to 18 months' imprisonment for being a hanjian. After serving his sentence, Wang Wenti settled in Hong Kong and has been involved in many education projects with the mainland since the 1980s.

See also

Huang Yiguang, and his assassination attempt on Wang Jingwei
Vidkun Quisling
Ye Wanyong
Anton Mussert

Notes

References

Further reading
David P. Barrett and Larry N. Shyu, eds.; Chinese Collaboration with Japan, 1932–1945: The Limits of Accommodation Stanford University Press 2001.
Gerald Bunker, The Peace Conspiracy; Wang Ching-wei and the China war, 1937–1941  Harvard University Press, 1972.
James C. Hsiung and Steven I. Levine, eds. China's Bitter Victory: The War with Japan, 1937–1945  M. E. Sharpe, 1992.
Ch'i Hsi-sheng, Nationalist China at War: Military Defeats and Political Collapse, 1937–1945 University of Michigan Press, 1982.
Wen-Hsin Yeh, "Wartime Shanghai",Taylor & Francis e-Library, 2005.
Rana Mitter, "Forgotten Ally: China's World War II. 1937–1945" Houghton Mifflin Harcourt, 2013. . Complete re-examination of the Chinese wars with Japan which argues that the memory of 'betrayals' by Britain, America, and Russia continues to influence China's worldview today.
Peter Kien-hong YU, Testing the Theory, WANG Jingwei Worked Under DAI Li, the Spymaster, https://www.storm.mg/article/3945430, dated September 19, 2021.  Accused of Being a Big Traitor to China, Could WANG JingWei Be Rehabilitated？"Mainland China Studies Newsletter (Department of Political Science, National Taiwan University), No.135 (September 2020),pp. 7~20 and No.136 (December 2020), pp. 4~14.  See also Chapter 2 and Appendix VII. WANG JingWei: A Talk About Some Labels That He Received (or Could Receive) During the March 1940 and November 1944 Period in ibid., Debunking Social Science and Confiding the ___ Theory (San Francisco: www.Academia.edu., January 2021), pages 151~160.(PDF) Debunking Social Science and Confiding the ___ Theory: Cheat and Last Cheat | peter k. h. yu - Academia.edu

External links

Japan's Asian Axis Allies: Chinese National Government of Nanking 

1883 births
1944 deaths
People from Sanshui District
Chinese collaborators with Imperial Japan
Kuomintang collaborators with Imperial Japan
Chinese fascists
Chinese people of World War II
Chinese revolutionaries
Failed assassins
Foreign Ministers of the Republic of China
Expelled members of the Kuomintang
Traitors in history
People of the Chinese Civil War
Premiers of the Republic of China
Presidents of the Republic of China
World War II political leaders
Republic of China politicians from Guangdong
Chinese anti-communists
Chinese nationalists
Tongmenghui members
Chinese expatriates in France
People of the Northern Expedition
Politicians from Foshan